The Kuwait Ministry of Defence is one of the governmental bodies of Kuwait. Its minister in charge is a member of the Cabinet of Kuwait.  The current caretaker Minister of Defense is Talal Khaled Al-Ahmad Al-Sabah, having assumed the role of while Defense Minister Sheikh Abdullah Ali Abdullah Al-Sabah is on leave,.

Minister 

On 1 July 1961, when the ministry was not of birth yet during Operation Vantage; the Kuwait Army was the de facto command leadership of the available armed forces since establishment and acted as official minister advising the Emir of Kuwait on course of action. The Kuwait Army  redesignated in 1953 was founded 13 years before the enacting of the Kuwait ministry, mainly by Field Marshal Sheikh Abdullah Mubarak Al-Sabah (youngest son of Mubarak Al-Sabah) in 1949.

List of ministers of defense and deputy prime ministers (1962–present) 

The ministry has been headed by the following people since its inception in 1962:

General functions

The major function of the ministry is to implement the government's defence policy and to govern all branches of the Kuwait Armed Forces. It is also responsible for the production, transfer, use, storage, and coordination of mines; and for mine clearance.

The ministry publishes a monthly magazine called Homat Al Watan.

References

1962 establishments in Kuwait
Kuwait
Defense
Kuwait, Defense
Military of Kuwait